George Dyson may refer to:

 George Dyson (composer) (1883–1964), English composer
 George Dyson (science historian) (born 1953), writer on science